Foxholm is a census-designated place and unincorporated community in Ward County, North Dakota, United States. Its population was 75 as of the 2010 census.

Foxholm is in the Des Lacs River Valley.

A post office called Foxholm was established in 1894, and remained in operation until 1967. The community supposedly was named after a place in England.

Demographics

Fred’s standard Foxholm

In the early 1970s, we used to stop at this gas station on the way to Donny Brook raceway and fill up our motorcycles and paint truck. I believe it was Fred’s standard at the time and he would come out and fill us up but the pumps were even old at that time and only read half the price so he would double the price that it read on the pump.

References

Census-designated places in Ward County, North Dakota
Census-designated places in North Dakota
Unincorporated communities in North Dakota
Unincorporated communities in Ward County, North Dakota